Flore Zoé (Flore Zoé van den Wijngaart) (born 1975) is a fine art and fashion photographer from the Netherlands. she was born in Delft.

Her series 'ART meets FASHION' has been exhibited around the world and was more recently shown during 2010 New York Fashion Week and Paris Fashion Week. 
'ART meets FASHION' was also shown during 'Vitrine 2010', an initiative of the Flanders Fashion Institute. 

Since April 2012 a selection of Zoé's works are being exhibited at the Opera Gallery Paris and Monaco.

Her images have been used and published by fashion houses, coffee-table books, labels and magazines, as well as the music industry.

References

External links 
 Official Website

Dutch photographers
Dutch women photographers
Living people
1975 births
Artists from The Hague
Fine art photographers